The 2014 Coral UK Championship was a professional ranking snooker tournament that took place between 25 November and 7 December 2014 at the Barbican Centre in York, England. It was the fifth ranking event of the 2014/2015 season.

Neil Robertson was the defending champion, but he lost 5–6 against Graeme Dott in the last 16. This result led to Ding Junhui becoming the first Asian player to reach the world number one ranking.

Ronnie O'Sullivan won his fifth UK Championship and his 27th ranking title by defeating Judd Trump 10–9 in the final. Trump had trailed 4–9 at one point during the evening session but fought back with 5 consecutive frames to level at 9–9 before O’Sullivan won the deciding frame.

Ronnie O'Sullivan made the 109th official maximum break during his last 16 match against Matthew Selt. This was O'Sullivan's 13th official 147 break and also the fourth maximum break in the 2014/2015 season and the third time in a row that a maximum was made in a UK Championship.

Judd Trump made his 300th career century during his last-64 match against Fraser Patrick.

Starting in this year the Semi-finals were reduced from the best of 17 frames to the best of 11 frames. This meant that all rounds up to the Semi-finals were played using the best of 11 frames format. The final was still played over the best of 19 frames. This is the format that is still being used to the current day.

Prize fund
The breakdown of prize money for this year is shown below:

 Winner: £150,000
 Runner-up: £70,000
 Semi-final: £30,000
 Quarter-final: £20,000
 Last 16: £12,000
 Last 32: £9,000
 Last 64: £3,000

 Highest break: £4,000
 Maximum break: £40,000
 Total: £740,000

Main draw

Top half

Section 1

Section 2

Section 3

Section 4

Bottom half

Section 5

Section 6

Section 7

Section 8

Finals

Final

Century breaks

 147, 133, 125, 117, 106, 104  Ronnie O'Sullivan
 142, 137, 108, 103, 102  Stuart Bingham
 139  Gerard Greene
 139  Fraser Patrick
 138, 125, 115, 103  Mark Allen
 138  Michael Holt
 137, 117  Thepchaiya Un-Nooh
 137  Igor Figueiredo
 137  Shaun Murphy
 134, 105  Ding Junhui
 132, 126, 113, 108, 104  Stephen Maguire
 132, 116  Nigel Bond
 132  Matthew Stevens
 131  Xiao Guodong
 130, 129, 127, 120, 112, 110, 104, 102, 100  Judd Trump
 129, 128, 101, 100  Ricky Walden
 129, 128  John Higgins
 127, 120, 117  Graeme Dott
 127  Mark Joyce
 127  Peter Ebdon
 126  David Morris
 124  Mark Selby
 122  Matthew Selt
 115, 105  Ryan Day
 115, 103  Jamie Cope
 114  Liang Wenbo
 113  Michael Wasley
 112, 106, 101  Marco Fu
 110, 109, 109, 102  Ken Doherty
 110  Jimmy White
 110  Rod Lawler
 109  Mike Dunn
 109  Tony Drago
 108, 106, 100  Neil Robertson
 107  Ben Woollaston
 107  Ratchayothin Yotharuck
 104  Robin Hull
 103  Luca Brecel
 103  Rory McLeod
 103  Anthony McGill
 102, 101  Joe Swail
 101  Barry Pinches
 101  Mark Williams
 100  Fergal O'Brien
 100  Zhang Anda
 100  James Wattana
 100  Yu Delu
 100  David Gilbert
 100  James Cahill

References

External links
 2014 Coral UK Championship – Pictures by Tai Chengzhe at Facebook
 

2014
UK Championship
UK Championship